Niakwa is a former provincial electoral division in the Canadian province of Manitoba.  It was created in 1979 and abolished in 1999.

The Niakwa riding was located in southeastern Winnipeg.  After its abolition, almost all of the riding's territory was given to the new riding of Southdale.

MLAs

Election results

Former provincial electoral districts of Manitoba

References